Tentrr, which was founded in 2015 by Michael D'Agostino and is based in New York City, is the camping equivalent of air BnB with more than one thousand properties in 43 states, especially in the northeast. Many of their sites are fully-furnished with a standard kit, with campers only needing to bring firewood and bedding. Others are so-called back-country locations and are more rustic in their offerings. Many are also dog-friendly.
 
Tentrr's sites include private property owners who rent part of their own land (called CampKeepers), state parks and more and allows users to book directly based on the features they're looking for. Louisiana was the first state to officially partner with Tentrr for state park access, and New York and Maine followed in 2021.  While the company saw steady growth in its initial years, it grew further during 2020 and 2021 as people sought travel alternatives during the COVID-19 pandemic.

References

External links 
 

Camping
American companies established in 2015
Companies based in New York City